Daisy Lake is a lake in the geographic townships of Butt and McCraney in the Unorganized South Part of Nipissing District, Ontario, Canada. The lake is in the Ottawa River drainage basin and is entirely within Algonquin Provincial Park.

There are three named inflows, the Petawawa River at the north (just downstream of that river's source at Ralph Bice Lake), Hambone Creek at the northwest and Casey Creek at the southwest, and one unnamed creek inflow at the west. The primary outflow is also the Petawawa River, which flows out of the east of the lake to the Ottawa River.

See also
List of lakes in Ontario

References

Lakes of Nipissing District